Ruth Blanchard Miller, also known as Ruth Miller Kempster, Ruth Blanchard Miller Kempster (January 17, 1904 – May 21, 1978) was an American artist.

Biography
Miller was born to Kempster Blanchard Miller and Antha (Knowlton) Miller in Chicago, Illinois. Her uncle was Azariel Blanchard Miller, founder of the city of Fontana, California.

Miller began her studies with a correspondence course  from the Kansas City Art Institute. She continued her studies at the Stickney Memorial Art School in Pasadena, California, with more classes at the Otis Art Institute in Los Angeles. Miller studied sculpture, painting, and lithography at the  Art Students League of New York.

In the 1930s Miller taught art in Pasadena at the School of Fine Arts.

In 1932 she won a silver medal in the art competitions of the Olympic Games for her painting "Struggle".

Miller died on May 21, 1978 in Santa Barbara, California, at the age of 74.

References

External links
 Ruth Blanchard Miller images askART

 
 
 

1904 births
1978 deaths
American women painters
Olympic silver medalists in art competitions
Artists from Chicago
20th-century American women artists
Medalists at the 1932 Summer Olympics
Kansas City Art Institute alumni
Otis College of Art and Design alumni
Art Students League of New York alumni
Olympic competitors in art competitions